Tom Thompson was a former Australian professional soccer player who played as a forward for NSW clubs and the Australia national soccer team.

Club career
Thompson played out his club career at hometown Balgownie, Granville and Wollongong Steelworks.

International career
Thompson began his international career with Australia in 1922 on their first historic tour against New Zealand, debuting in a 1–3 defeat to New Zealand. He played two matches in 1922, three matches in 1923 and another three matches against Canada in 1924.

Career statistics

International

References

Australian soccer players
Association football forwards
Australia international soccer players